Caulie Frank Whitehead (July 2, 1892 – May 16, 1976) was an American politician. He was Mayor of Jacksonville, Florida, from 1945 to 1949. He was a member of the Democratic Party.

History
Whitehead ran for Mayor of Jacksonville in 1945. He defeated the incumbent John T. Alsop, Jr., who had been mayor for eighteen years from 1923 to 1937 and from 1941 to 1945, in the Democratic primary; as there was no general election, Whitehead became mayor. Among his initiatives was a plan to ease the city's growing traffic problems by building a new bridge out of pontoons over the St. Johns River. This plan never came to fruition, but influenced the later construction of the conventional Fuller Warren Bridge. Whitehead was defeated in the 1949 mayoral race by the upstart W. Haydon Burns, who successfully courted African-American voters to overcome Whitehead. In Whitehead's later years he owned and ran a room-and-boarding house in Jacksonville. He died in 1976.

References

External links 
 Political Graveyard

Mayors of Jacksonville, Florida
Florida Democrats
1976 deaths
1892 births
20th-century American politicians